This is a list of San Francisco Bay Area wildflowers. The San Francisco Bay Area is unusual, for a major metropolitan area, in having ready access to rural and wilderness areas, as well as major urban parks. Particularly in spring, these offer a rich range of wild flowers.

List scope
The native plants of the San Francisco Bay Area are not always typical of other regions of California, and some species are endemic. This list covers the flowers of the Bay Area one is most likely to see within its nine counties. It starts with flowers that are (a) common and/or (b) already have an article in Wikipedia. Flowering shrubs and trees are only included if their flowers are visually significant.

List
The list is divided into forbs (herbs), shrubs, and trees.

Flowering herbs (forbs)
California poppy, Eschscholzia californica
Purple Chinese houses, Collinsia heterophylla
Yellow pansy, Viola pedunculata
Franciscan wallflower, Erysimum franciscanum
Douglas iris, Iris douglasiana
Baby blue-eyes, Nemophila menziesii
Coral bells, Heuchera spp.
Western blue-eyed grass, Sisyrinchium bellum
Calypso orchid, Calypso bulbosa
Fiddlenecks, Amsinckia
Blue flax, Linum lewisii
Cow parsnip, Heracleum maximum
Common star lily, Toxicoscordion fremontii
Crimson columbine, Aquilegia formosa
Wavy-leafed soap plant, Chlorogalum pomeridianum
Farewell to spring, Clarkia amoena

Bushes, shrubs, and climbers
Bush lupin, Lupinus ssp.
Manzanitas, Arctostaphylos spp.
California wild grape, Vitis californica
California lilacs, Ceanothus spp.
Pipestem clematis, Clematis lasiantha
Salmonberry, Rubus spectabilis
California rose, Rosa californica
California huckleberry, Vaccinium ovatum
California manroot, Marah fabacea
Currants, Ribes spp.
Chaparral currant, Ribes malvaceum

Flowering trees
California buckeye, Aesculus californica
Black elderberry, Sambucus nigra
Pacific madrone, Arbutus menziesii
Coast live oak, Quercus agrifolia

Garden escapes
Garden escapes are introduced species, plants that have established in the area - via their seeds, underground runners, or by exuberant growth - beyond the limits of gardens where planted. Some may be reproducing in the wild as invasive species and noxious weeds. Because of the large population of the Bay Area and its variety of garden styles, many plant species may be encountered as garden escapes.  
Among those seen are:
Acacia spp.
Bougainvillea spp.  
Common Broom (Spanish, French, others)
Cortaderia spp. (Pampas grass)
Eucalyptus spp.
Forget-me-nots (Myosotis discolor and M. latifolia) 
Ice plant - several genera
Ivy - Hedera spp.
Lavender
Nassella tenuissima - Mexican feather grass
Pelargonium spp.
Pennisetum setaceum
Rubus armeniacus – Himalayan Blackberry
Searocket 
Vinca major

Weeds
Purple salsify
Artichoke thistle
Red Valerian 
Herb Robert 
Wild radish 
Scarlet Pimpernel 
Pale Flax

See also

List of California native plants
Index: Flora of the San Francisco Bay Area

External links
Calflora Database — can create custom polygon on site's map to define scope of flora searches.
CalPlants photo archive — can be searched by California county, or plant species.
Jepson Interchange — search by plant name, geographical location, or other keys

.San Francisco

San Francisco Bay Area
wildflowers
.